Dallas Anderson (12 July 1874, in Crieff, Scotland, UK – 16 November 1934, Richmond, Virginia, USA) was a Scottish stage and film actor, whose credits include 22 appearances on Broadway.

Selected filmography
 The Fordington Twins (1920)
 The Fall of a Saint (1920)
 The Edge of Youth (1920)
 Walls of Prejudice (1920)
 Branded (1920)

References

External links
 

1874 births
1934 deaths
Scottish male film actors
Scottish male stage actors
20th-century British male actors
Scottish male silent film actors
Scottish emigrants to the United States